Christmas plants are flowers or vegetation from garden plants associated with the festive season of Christmas. There are also a wide variety of plants that include "Christmas" in their common name.

Africa

South Africa 
Christmas Bell is one name given to Sandersonia ssp,  A genus of South African plants.

Asia

India 
Decorative plants for Christmas celebrations may include species of Viscum, Lycopodium cernuum, and Acanthus ilicifolius.

Sri Lanka 
Monterey Cypress trees are often used as Christmas trees due to their conical shape and their longevity once cut

Thailand 
Species used as Christmas trees include monkey puzzle trees, Casuarina equisetifolia, and C. junghuhniana.

Europe 
Plants commonly used for Christmas decoration and symbolism across Europe include ivy, mistletoe and holly. Ivy leaves are seen as symbolizing eternity and resurrection.

Christmas wreaths originated in Europe, and are traditionally made with 

spruce, pine or cedar branches
 pinecones from evergreen trees
 holly berries or branches

Balkans 
The badnjak or budnik is a custom shared across the Balkan region involving a tree, tree branches, or a log being brought into the home and burned. The tradition may differ between countries like Bulgaria, Croatia, and Serbia.

Caucasus

Georgia 
The chichilaki is the traditional Georgian Christmas tree, and is made from dried hazelnut or walnut branches that are shaved and shaped into a tree shape. They may be decorated with small fruits and berries.

Western Europe 
Some common plants used to decorate in this region include English holly, winterberry, witch hazel, and Nordmann fir, which is commonly used in sprays. Lichens and mosses may be used as decorative garlands.

Germany 
Plants specific to German sprays include acacia foliage and the cone-bearing branches of Douglas firs.

Ireland 
Traditional decorative Christmas plants include holly, mistletoe, and poinsettias. Other plants, like Jerusalem cherry, English ivy, and potted azaleas may also be encountered.

Spain 
Tio de Nadal is a tradition from the Catalan region involving a log which is propped up and given a face. If the children of the home care for the log properly, it will defecate presents on Christmas Eve or Christmas Day.

United Kingdom 
Some plants used for wreaths and sprays include English holly, cherry laurel, and Portugal laurel. 

The yule log is a tradition in many Germanic countries, but has also become popular in the UK. 

One older tradition involves bringing potted cherry or hawthorn trees indoors, so that they can flower at Christmastime.

North America 
Christmas Cactus, thus called because of when it flowers, is native to Brazil but is a popular ornamental plant in North America. Varieties include Schlumbergera opuntioides, Schlumbergera kautskyi, and Schlumbergera microsphaerica.

Caribbean 
Historically, the Christmas tree of choice in the Caribbean has been the Caribbean pine. Festive flowering plants used for decoration include poinsettia, Porana pamiculala, and Antigonon leptopus.

Mexico 
Poinsettias are native to Mexico and its Central American neighbors.

Radishes feature in the Christmas season tradition of Noche de Rábanos, or Night of the Radishes which is held on December 23rd in Oaxaca City, Mexico. During the event participants carve large radishes into elaborate scenes.

United States 
Christmas trees and wreaths were brought to the United States by various communities of European settlers and immigrants. The specific species of tree used for these traditions differs depending on region. On the west coast, the Douglas fir has historically been the species of choice when it comes to Christmas trees, while in Appalachia the Fraser fir is more popular. 

In California wreaths have been made from coast redwood and hollyleaf cherry. Plants used in decorative arrangements include Christmas-berry, cypress, firethorn, and pepper-tree. In the southern part of the state decorative plants may also include citrus plants, eucalyptus, magnolias, and poinsettias.  

In Texas and Louisiana decorative plants include Christmas fern, chrysanthemums, holly, American mistletoe, and poinsettias. Historically, Spanish moss and ball moss might be dipped in flour while wet. Once dry, they could be used as snowball decorations.

In southeast region of the country, decorative plants include camellias, holly, mistletoe, privet, quince, and Magnolia grandiflora. Wreaths and sprays may be made from the longleaf pine and the Australian pine. 

Along the Gulf Coast, several different types of palms are used as decorative plants, including Sabal palletto, the royal palm, Washingtonia robusta, and Phoenix canariesis.

Oceania

Australia 
The name Tasmanian Christmas Bell is applied in Australia to Blandfordia ssp., including Blandfordia punicea.

Several different species of plants in Australia are referred to as Christmas Bush, including:
 Correa, a genus of Australian plants with distinctive bell shaped  
 Chromolaena odorata
Ceratopetalum gummiferum - New South Wales Christmas bush, ornamental tree.
Prostanthera lasianthos - Victorian Christmas bush.
Several plants in Australia are referred to or used as Christmas trees, including Nuytsia floribunda and the Norfolk Island Pine, which is commonly sold in Australian stores during the Christmas season and is usually marketed as a "Living Christmas tree"

New Zealand 
Pōhutukawa, sometimes called the New Zealand Christmas Tree, has bright red flowers which usually appear in December.

Alstroemeria pulchella, known as the New Zealand Christmas bell, is a popular ornamental plant during the Christmas season.

Misc 
Christmas tree is applied to a number of plants:
 fir, spruce, pine, balsam or other evergreen trees decorated for Christmas
 Pinus pinea or the Italian Stone Pine, is another plant commonly sold in stores as a potted live plant. 

Christmas rose can be any of the following:
 Helleborus ssp., especially Helleborus niger
 a species of hydrangea, Hydrangea macrophylla
 Serissa foetida (also known as "snow rose" or "winter rose") originally from tropical regions of Asia; cultivated Serissa often blooms during the winter.

Other plants with "Christmas" in their name include:
 "Christmas costus" (Costus chartaceus)
 "Christmas moss" (Vesicularia montagnei)

See Also 

 Christmas tree
 Christmas flowers

References